MTR Bus is a public bus service in Hong Kong operated by the MTR Corporation. It serves the northwestern part of the New Territories. Also known as MTR Feeder Bus (previously operated by the Kowloon-Canton Railway Corporation as KCR Feeder Bus), it comprises a network of 15 feeder bus routes for the convenience of passengers using the MTR rapid transit network. The routes provide access to and between many MTR stations on the East Rail line, Tuen Ma line and Light Rail.

As of December 2014, the MTR Bus fleet comprised 149 buses. The service carried approximately 50 million passengers in 2014 and is integrated with MTR's fare system to allow East Rail line, Tuen Ma line and Light Rail passengers who use Octopus cards to enjoy the free feeder bus services that link many housing estates along these lines.

References

External links

MTR Bus Routes and Fares
MTR Bus and Feeder Bus Guide

Bus companies of Hong Kong
Bus transport in Hong Kong
Feeder Bus